Jeremy Brodeur (born October 29, 1996) is an American professional ice hockey goaltender who is currently playing with Manchester Storm in the UK's EIHL.

Playing career
Brodeur spent three years playing his junior hockey in the Ontario Hockey League (OHL) for the Oshawa Generals, drafted by the team in 2013 in the eighth round. As a member of the Generals, Brodeur had a 2.78 goals-against average and .904 save percentage, becoming the franchise's all-time leader in shutouts along with winning the OHL Championship and Memorial Cup in 2014–15.

He played in prospect camps for the Columbus Blue Jackets and the Dallas Stars, but did not sign with either team. Brodeur joined the New York Rangers on a professional try out, but was released after the first preseason game against his father's former team, the New Jersey Devils.

He signed with the Toledo Walleye of the ECHL after the end of the OHL's 2016–17 season, but did not appear in a game. In 2017–18, he signed with the Allen Americans in the ECHL. He was then acquired off waivers by the Norfolk Admirals during the 2018–19 season.

In 2019, Brodeur signed with the Peoria Rivermen of the Southern Professional Hockey League.

After a short stint in 2020 with UK EIHL side Sheffield Steelers, Brodeur returned to the SPHL and signed with Knoxville Ice Bears in October 2020.  In January 2021, and after posting a shutout in his first start of the season, Brodeur signed an AHL contract with Binghamton Devils of the American Hockey League.  In April 2022, Brodeur made his first AHL start with an incredible 47 save performance on 50 shots against division leading Hershey Bears and was named the game's third star.

By the timeframe of the late summer and early autumn of 2021, Brodeur had made an appearance for the Boston Bruins as a potential goaltending prospect, initially at the tri-team "2021 Prospects Challenge" tryouts, held in Buffalo, New York between the NHL prospects of the Boston Bruins, Buffalo Sabres and his father's former team, the New Jersey Devils and under a week later, at the Warrior Ice Arena, the practice rink of the Bruins, Brodeur was listed as one of the goaltending participants in the Bruins' official 2021 training camp roster.

As a free agent from the Devils, Brodeur was signed to a AHL contract over the summer with the Providence Bruins of the AHL and split the 2021–22 season between the Bruins and the Maine Mariners of the ECHL.

On September 6, 2022, Brodeur continued his career in the ECHL, signing a contract with the Norfolk Admirals. Then, after a spell with South Carolina Stingrays, Brodeur signed for UK EIHL side Manchester Storm in November 2022.

Personal life
Brodeur was born in Essex Fells, New Jersey, when his father, Martin was a member of the New Jersey Devils. His brother Anthony has also played professional hockey as a goaltender.

References

External links

1996 births
Living people
Allen Americans players
American men's ice hockey goaltenders
Binghamton Devils players
Knoxville Ice Bears (SPHL) players
Maine Mariners (ECHL) players
Manchester Storm (2015–) players
Oshawa Generals players
People from Essex Fells, New Jersey
Peoria Rivermen (SPHL) players
Ice hockey players from New Jersey
Sportspeople from Essex County, New Jersey
Toledo Walleye players
Sheffield Steelers players
South Carolina Stingrays players
American twins